The Codex Mendoza is an Aztec codex, believed to have been created around the year 1541. It contains a history of both the Aztec rulers and their conquests as well as a description of the daily life of pre-conquest Aztec society. The codex is written in the Nahuatl language using traditional Aztec pictograms with a translation and explanation of the text provided in Spanish. It is named after Don Antonio de Mendoza (1495-1552), the viceroy of New Spain, who supervised its creation and who was a leading patron of native artists. 

Mendoza knew that the ravages of the conquest had destroyed multiple native artifacts, and that the craft traditions that generated them had been effaced. When the Spanish crown ordered Mendoza to provide evidence of the Aztec political and tribute system, he invited skilled artists and scribes who were being schooled at the Franciscan college in Tlatelolco to gather in a workshop under the supervision of Spanish priests where they could recreate the document for him and the King of Spain. The pictorial document that they produced became known as the Codex Mendoza: it consists of seventy-one folios made of Spanish paper measuring 20.6 × 30.6 centimeters (8.25 × 12.25 inches). The document is crafted in the native style, but it now is bound at a spine in the manner of European books.

The codex is also known as the Codex Mendocino and La colección Mendoza, and has been held at the Bodleian Library at Oxford University since 1659. It was removed from public exhibition on 23 December 2011. The Bodleian Library holds four other Mesoamerican codices: Codex Bodley, Codex Laud, Codex Selden, and the Selden Roll.

History 

The manuscript must date from after 6 July 1529, since Hernán Cortéz is referred to on folio 15r as 'marques del Valle'. It must have been produced before 1553, when it was in the possession of the French cosmographer André Thevet, who wrote his name on folios 1r, 2r, 70v, 71v.

The final page of the manuscript explains some of the circumstances in which it was produced. 

The manuscript was therefore finished in haste and designed to be sent to Spain. More precise information regarding the exact date of the manuscript and the reasons it was produced is controversial. The testimony of the conquistador Jerónimo López, probably dating from 1547, may be relevant.

Silvio Zavala argued that the book referred to was the Codex Mendoza, and his arguments were restated by Federico Gómez de Orozco. If this is the case, then the Codex was written circa 1541 ('six years ago more or less' from López's recollection) and was commissioned by Mendoza. As H. B. Nicolson has pointed out, however, the description is not an exact fit for the Codex, and the identification is not certain.

According to a later account by Samuel Purchas, a later owner of the Codex, writing in 1625, the Spanish fleet was attacked by French privateers and all of the booty, including the codex, was taken to France.

It was certainly in the possession of André Thévet, cosmographer to King Henry II of France. Thévet wrote his name in five places on the codex, twice with the date 1553. It was later owned by the Englishman Richard Hakluyt. According again to Samuel Purchas, Hakluyt bought the Codex for 20 French francs. Some time after 1616 it was passed to Samuel Purchas, then to his son, and then to John Selden. The codex was deposited into the Bodleian Library at Oxford University in 1659, five years after Selden's death, where it remained in obscurity until 1831, when it was rediscovered by Viscount Kingsborough and brought to the attention of scholars.

Content 

Written on European paper, it contains 71 pages, divided into three sections:
Section I, folios 1r to 17r or 18r, is a history of the Aztec people from 1325 through 1521 — from the founding of Tenochtitlan through the Spanish conquest. It lists the reign of each ruler and the towns conquered by them. It is uncertain whether folios 17v and 18r belong to Section I or Section II.
Section II, folios 17v or 18v to 54v, provides a list of the towns conquered by the Triple Alliance and the tributes paid by each. This section is closely related to, and probably copied from, the Matrícula de Tributos, but the Codex Mendoza contains five provinces not included in the Matrícula. This probably represents material now missing from the Matrícula, but present when the Codex Mendoza was copied.
Section III, folios 56v to 71v, is a pictorial depiction of the daily life of the Aztecs.

Folios 73 to 85 of MS. Arch. Selden. A. 1, as currently foliated, do not form part of the Codex Mendoza. These folios comprise an originally separate manuscript, apparently written in England in the first half of the seventeenth century. This manuscript contains tables of the comparative value of Roman, Greek, English, and French money. The two manuscripts were bound together in England in the early seventeenth century.

Section I

Gallery

Section II

Gallery

Section III

Gallery

References

External links 

A description of the Codex
Review of The Essential Codex Mendoza
Details of public exhibition
Full digital facsimile with transcriptions, translations and commentary
MS. Arch. Selden. A. 1 In the Bodleian Libraries catalogue of Medieval Manuscripts
Full digital facsimile available on Digital Bodleian

Mendoza, Codex
1540s books
16th-century illuminated manuscripts
Aztec society
1540s in Mexico
1540s in New Spain
Bodleian Library collection
1540s in North America
16th century in the Aztec civilization